Northcott may refer to:

People
Bayan Northcott (born 1940), English composer
Douglas Northcott (1916–2005), British mathematician
Gordon Stewart Northcott, Canadian serial killer
Gustavus A. Northcott, American politician serving 1905–1907
John Northcott (1890–1966), Australian general
Lawrence Northcott (1908–1986), Canadian ice hockey player
Michael Northcott (born 1955), British theologian and professor of Ethics
Ron Northcott (born 1935), Canadian curling player
Ruth J. Northcott (1913–1969), Canadian astronomer
Tom Northcott, Canadian folk-rock singer
Tommy Northcott (1931–2008), English footballer

Other uses
Northcott, Cornwall, a hamlet in England
Northcott, Devon, a village and civil parish in England
Northcott Disability Services also known as The NSW Society for Crippled Children or The Northcott Society
Northcott Theatre at University of Exeter, England
Northcott Municipal Council, original name for the first City of South Sydney
Electoral district of Northcott, Australia
3670 Northcott, asteroid

See also
Cold Northcott

English-language surnames
Surnames of English origin
English toponymic surnames